The Essex V6 is a 90° V6 engine family built by the Ford Motor Company at the Essex Engine Plant in Windsor, Ontario, Canada. This engine is unrelated to Ford's British Essex V6. Introduced in 1982, versions of the Essex V6 engine family were used in subcompact through to large cars, vans, minivans, and some pickup trucks. The Essex V6 was last used in the 2008 regular-cab F-150, after which it was succeeded by a version of the Ford Cyclone engine. An industrial version of the engine was available until 2015.

Design and early production
The Essex V6 is an overhead valve (OHV) V6 engine with a 90° angle between cylinder banks, a single cam-in-block, and two valves per cylinder operated by pushrods and rocker arms. Split crankshaft pins permit even firing intervals. Versions of the engine used in front-engine, front-wheel-drive layouts (FWD) have a different bellhousing pattern than those use in front-engine, rear-wheel-drive layouts (RWD).

In 1977 Ford foresaw the need to develop a new engine for use in mid-size cars and light trucks in the 1980s. They began a project to design a V6 engine that would be lightweight, fuel efficient, and reliable. To meet the first criteria, many components were to be made of aluminum, including the intake manifold, front cover, water pump, oil pump, water outlet, rear cover plate, EGR distribution spacer, distributor, carburetor, engine block and cylinder heads. The rocker covers were of glass-filled nylon. The first engines were complete in early 1978 and successfully met all design objectives, but tooling and material cost increases prompted a redesign with a cast iron block while keeping the aluminum heads. Other lightweight features that were deleted in the redesign included a hollow-core crankshaft, stamped steel exhaust manifolds, and an aluminum harmonic balancer and camshaft sprocket. The first cast iron engines were complete by February 1979. Even with the weight increases due to the redesign, it was the lightest V6 engine of any displacement ever built in North America to that time.

The earliest production blocks exhibited a tendency to develop a crack in the camshaft bearing bulkhead that could propagate down to the bearing bore under high speed conditions. The problem, caused by the accelerated cooling of the blocks produced at full production speeds, was solved by increasing the width of the rib. To deal with the 5000 already completed engines that had received the potentially flawed block, Ford ran the engine assembly line backwards, disassembling the engines and stockpiling the internal components. The line was then run forward and the engines were reassembled using the stockpiled components and new engine blocks.

SPI
In 1996 the Essex V6 received Ford's Split Port Induction (SPI) system, a form of variable-length intake manifold. In this system, the intake port to each intake valve is split into a primary and secondary passage. The primary passage contains the injector for the cylinder, and introduces the air tangentially to the cylinder for maximum swirl. The secondary passage contains an intake manifold runner control (IMRC) deactivation valve which opens for high speed and wide-open throttle (WOT) situations to provide a minimally restricted path for additional air to maximize volumetric efficiency and power.

Other changes that were part of the SPI system included lightweight valves, larger intake valves, revised exhaust ports, revised valve seats, an increased compression ratio, and new cylinder heads that were shared by both the 3.8 L and 4.2 L versions of the Essex V6. The IMRC assembly was likewise shared, while the upper intake manifold differed between the two engine versions.

The addition of the SPI system resulted in a 33% increase in peak power, a 7% increase in peak torque, and a 2% reduction in fuel consumption for the 3.8 L Essex. The 4.2 L saw similar improvements, and its longer stroke and use of longer intake runners resulted in an even greater increase in low speed torque.

Origin rumors
Two rumors about the origin of the Essex V6 engine's design have circulated:

That the Essex V6 is a Ford small block V8 engine with two cylinders removed
That the Essex V6 is a copy of the Buick V6 engine.

Although the practice of deriving a V6 from a V8 is not unheard of, there are significant differences between the small block V8 and the Essex V6. The bore and stroke of the nearly square V8 are very different from those of the oversquare Essex V6, as are their bore center spacings, making a common lineage unlikely. Also, while the versions of the Essex V6 used in RWD applications shared their bell housing pattern with the 5.0 L small block V8 engine, the FWD version did not, having a pattern that matched the 3.0 L Vulcan V6 instead.

The second claim is also based on the two engines sharing certain features, including; a short rigid block, but shorter on the Ford and with different bore spacings; similar, but not identical, bore and stroke dimensions; similar rods and mains dimensions; a rolled radius on the mains; split rod pins for even firing intervals on the 90° block, although with different bobweight percentages; a cam located by a spring-loaded thrust button, later designed out on the Ford; and an aluminum front cover for the oil and water pumps.

In a paper published in the Society of Automotive Engineers SAE Transactions detailing the origin and development of the Essex V6, there are several places where either the Ford 5.0 L V8 or a "competitive 3.8L V6" are mentioned, usually to serve as a contrast to a feature of the Essex V6. Under "Engine Test & Development", the article mentions that the engine's basic design assumptions were demonstrated using "competitive V6 engines" as well as the Ford 5.0 L V8 modified to operate as a 90° V6, but does not indicate that the Essex V6 was directly based on either of these proof-of-concept test engines. Instead, the article describes the Essex V6 as "an all-new lightweight 90° V6 engine".

3.8 L
The first Essex V6 released was a 3.8 L version introduced for the 1982 model year as an option on the Ford Granada.

Most early engines had a 2-barrel Motorcraft 2150 carburetor, while 50-state Lincoln Continentals and California Granada-Cougar-Thunderbird-XR7 cars got Ford's Motorcraft 7200 carburetor with variable venturi.

A 3.8 L V6 with SPI was introduced in the 1996 Windstar. The upper intake manifold has a sticker located on the passenger side of the forward plenum denoting "Split Port Induction".

For 1999 the 3.8 L in the Mustang was updated to use the split port cylinder heads originally introduced on the Windstar, but did not use IMRC, leaving all twelve intake runners open at all times.

A nine-digit serial number appears on a label on the right side (front) valve cover. It also appears on a barcode label on the transmission side of the right side head.

Applications:
 1982 Ford Granada
 1982–1983 Ford F-100
 1982–1997 Ford Thunderbird and Mercury Cougar
 1982–1986, 1994–2004 Ford Mustang
 1982–1986 Mercury Capri
 1983–1986 Ford LTD and Mercury Marquis
 1988–1995 Ford Taurus and Mercury Sable
 1988–1994 Lincoln Continental
 1995–2003 Ford Windstar

Supercharged 3.8 L
Ford developed a supercharged version of the 3.8 L Essex V6 that was used in two Ford MN12 platform cars beginning in the late 1980s. 

An intercooler was added to cool the intake charge. Internal changes to the engine included an engine block and cylinder heads modified to accommodate increased coolant flow, a fully counterweighted forged crankshaft, a billet camshaft with revised cam profiles, and hypereutectic alloy pistons, along with a reduction in the compression ratio to 8.2:1.

Five Thunderbirds with pre-release supercharged Essex V6s were supplied to the Arizona Highway Patrol in 1988 for road testing, even though the supercharged engine never became part of an official police package. In 1991 Ford again sent a batch of supercharged engines, this time in production Thunderbird SCs, to the Arizona Highway Patrol for hot weather testing.

The supercharged Essex 3.8 L debuted in the new-for-1989 Thunderbird Super Coupe and Cougar XR-7, becoming the first supercharged engine offered by an American manufacturer since the Studebaker Silver Hawk of the late 1950s or early 1960s. The standard transmission in the Thunderbird Super Coupe was a Mazda M5R2-RKE 5-speed manual transmission, while a 4-speed AOD automatic transmission was optional.

The supercharged Essex was dropped from the Cougar XR-7 in favor of a V8 shortly after the start of the 1991 model year, but continued to be used in the Super Coupe.

The supercharger got a larger, square-style inlet, a larger attaching inlet plenum, and Teflon coated rotors. The engine received larger fuel injectors, and the compression ratio was raised to 8.6:1. The Super Coupe was offered until 1995, after which production of the engine stopped.

Applications:
 1989–1995 Thunderbird Super Coupe
 1989–1990 Cougar XR-7

4.2 L

The largest displacement version of the Essex V6 appeared in the 1997 model year as a replacement for the Ford 300 straight six in the F-150.

The 4.2 L Essex has been described as one of the more reliable engines offered in the F-150 at the time, although the early engines did encounter some well-known problems. All 1997–1998 engines made at the Canadian Essex plant received a bad front cover gasket. Ford initially addressed this problem by using a thicker gasket for the 1999 model year and five years later, in 2004, replaced the earlier gasket with a completely redesigned part. The lower-intake manifold also had a reputation for cracking at relatively low miles.

The 4.2 L V6's final use was as the base engine in the 2008 F-150; the 2009 and 2010 F-150 was only offered with V8 engines, and starting with the 2011 model year the new 3.7 L Cyclone became the standard engine. The 2008 model year marked the end of the Essex V6's use in cars and trucks.

An industrial version of the 4.2 L Essex engine, called the ESG-642, was offered by Ford Power Products. Versions of this engine could use gasoline, Natural gas, or Liquified Petroleum gas as fuels. The ESG-642 was available until 2015, after which it was succeeded by the newer 3.7 L Cyclone-based CSG-637.

Applications:
 1997–2008 Ford F-150
 1997–2003 Ford E-150
 1997–2003 Ford E-250
 1998–2001 Ford F-250 (Only offered in Mexico starting in 1997, and in Brazil in the LHD short-bed version)
 2004–2007 Ford Freestar
 2004–2007 Mercury Monterey
 2004–2015 ESG-642 by Ford Power Products

3.9 L
A slightly revised version of the smaller Essex V6 was introduced in 2004. Overall engine output was unchanged from the earlier 3.8 L. It appeared as a running change on late-production 2004 Mustangs starting on October 7, 2003, then was replaced by the 4.0 L SOHC Ford Cologne V6 when the Mustang was redesigned for 2005. The 3.9 L continued in use in the Ford Freestar minivan until production of the engine ended in 2007.

Applications:
 2004 Ford Mustang
 2004–2007 Ford Freestar

See also
List of Ford engines
List of Ford bellhousing patterns

References

External links

 

Essex V6
Goods manufactured in Canada
V6 engines
Gasoline engines by model
History of Windsor, Ontario